The International Union of Game Biologists (IUGB) is a non-profit organisation with international membership. It has its legal domicile in Cernier, Switzerland. Bylaws were signed in Moscow in 2009.

The organization aims to promote the improvement of knowledge about game biology and related fields of study such as animal population management and habitat conservation. To reach this aim, a conference has taken place every two years since 1954.

Historical development  
The first meeting took place at the International Exhibition of Hunting and Game Fishing in Düsseldorf under the supervision of Fritz Nüsslein on October 16 and 17, 1954, at the suggestion of Harry Frank. A free association called "Internationaler Ring der Jagdwissenschaftler" was born. A second 1955 meeting was held in Graz, later congresses every second year. At the suggestion of H. M. Thamdrup it was supervised by a committee, later by the presidents of the old, new, and planned congress. The proceedings of the first and the second meeting were published in the Zeitschrift für Jagdwissenschaft and led to the creation of that journal, which later became the European Journal of Wildlife Research. Since Aarhus, 1957, the congress proceedings have been edited by the organiser of the meeting.

References 

Biology organizations